Aliens & Rainbows is the debut album by American pop rock singer-songwriter Ferras. It was released digitally on iTunes on March 11, 2008, and in CD format until April 1, 2008. The album was preceded by lead single "Hollywood's Not America". The album's second single was the track "Liberation Day", which failed to chart.

The album's third and final single was the track "Rush", which Ferras performed live with Katy Perry; it also failed to chart. Aliens & Rainbows charted at number 97 on the Billboard 200 selling 5,245 copies. It has since sold over 27,000 copies.

Critical reception

Jo-Ann Greene of AllMusic wrote that: "Ferras' performances are fabulous throughout, his lyrics thoughtful and eloquent. The themes are mostly personal and occasionally (as on "Dear God" and "My Beautiful Life") questioning, and even the romantic numbers have something new to say. The arrangements are stunning, the sound full, the atmosphere electric -- but with a debut this good, where will Ferras possibly go from here?" Mikael Wood, writing for Billboard, called it "an action-packed collection of high-gloss piano-pop production numbers in which the scenery counts for just as much as the sentiment." Gregory Robson of AbsolutePunk commended the first three tracks for showcasing Ferras' musicianship but felt the rest of the album comes across as "forced, perfectly planned and predictable" and suffers from The Matrix's "overambitious, contrived and squeaky clean" production. Entertainment Weeklys Simon Vozick-Levinson gave the album a "C–" grade, saying the best songs off of it are ruined with "overly slick production" and Ferras' vocal performance, concluding with: "Don't hold your breath waiting for gold at the end of these Rainbows."

Track listing

Personnel

 Mark Adelman – executive producer, management
 Chris Anokute – executive producer, A&R
 Charlie Bisharat – violin
 Ruth Bruegger – violin
 David Campbell – string arrangements
 Carole Castillo – viola
 Lauren Christy – producer
 Larry Corbett – cello
 Brian Dembow – viola
 Graham Edwards – producer
 Jason Flom – executive producer
 Armen Garabedian – violin
 Serban Ghenea – mixing
 Julian Hallmark – violin
 Victor Indrizzo – drums
 Suzie Katayama – cello, contractor
 Roland Kato – viola
 Natalie Leggett – violin
 Darrin McCann – viola
 Alyssa Park – violin
 Cindi Peters – production coordination
 Michelle Richards – violin
 Steve Richards – cello
 Bettie Ross – copyist
 Phil Sarna – management
 Allen Sides – string engineer
 Scott Spock – producer
 Tereza Stanislav – violin
 Josephina Vergara – violin
 John Wittenberg – violin
 David Wolter – A&R

References

External links
Ferras' Official Website

2008 debut albums
Ferras albums
Capitol Records albums
Albums produced by the Matrix (production team)